Geroskipou is a coastal village in Cyprus, east of Paphos. Its current population is approximately 7,000 and it is the second largest municipality in the Paphos District. Yeroskipou, with its remarkable five-domed Byzantine church of Agia Paraskevi, and its Folk Art Museum, is a popular tourist destination. It is known especially for the production of Turkish delight or "lokum" (locally loukoumia or lukum). The town is the only place in the world which has protected geographical indication (PGI) for the popular dessert.

History

According to local tradition, and as is implied in the etymology of the town's name, Yeroskipou was the site, in Greek mythology, of goddess Aphrodite's sacred gardens. Hence its name — "yeros" (ιερός, holy) and "kipou" (from κήπος, garden) — means "holy garden". Ancient pilgrims from Nea Paphos passed through Yeroskipou before reaching the temple of Aphrodite at Kouklia.

The Classical writer Strabo mentions Yeroskipou, calling the settlement Ἱεροκηπία (Hierokepía Hierokepis). Many other travellers have written that in the coastal plain of Yeroskipou there were centuries old olives and carob trees.

In the 11th century, the five-domed Byzantine church of Agia Paraskevi was built in the middle of present-day settlement. It is also mentioned that at Moulia, a coastal locality of the town, the miraculous icon of Panagia of Khrysorogiatissa was found by the monk Ignatios, who carried it to Rogia mountain from where the monastery took its name.

In 1811, Sir Sidney visited Yeroskipou and met Andreas Zimboulakis, appointing him as a vice-consul of Britain. Zimboulaki, who was born in Kefalonia, settled in Yeroskipou and his duties as vice-consul were to protect the interests of Britain. The house of Zimboulaki  where many personalities were hosted, was bought in 1947 by the Department of Antiquities, to be converted into Folk Art Museum.

In 1821, the village had 30 adult male Turkish Cypriots and 76 adult male Greek Cypriots. By 1911, the village had a population of 602, with 477 Greek and 125 Turkish Cypriots. In the next decades, the Greek Cypriot population grew rapidly while the Turkish Cypriot population declined: in 1931, there were 751 Greek Cypriots and 105 Turkish Cypriots. In 1960, the village had a population of 1722, with 1552 Greek and 170 Turkish Cypriots.

A British firm set up a factory for silk production in 1925. Hundreds of workers both from Yeroskipou and the surrounding villages were employed in it. However, the factory closed in 1952. It is also mentioned that at Yeroskipou there was also a linen-processing factory.

In 1952, the small Turkish Cypriot population of the village mostly spoke Greek. The village lived off agriculture and Turkish Cypriots were mostly better off than their Greek neighbours, though many villagers lacked titles to land and worked as daily labourers. The village did not have a mosque and the Turkish Cypriot villagers at times went to the church for their Muslim worship and practiced some Christian rites at Easter. In 1952, efforts were underway to rebuild the roads of the village, Turkish language courses were scheduled for Turkish Cypriot children and the school building was in ruinous condition.

In 1964, following the intercommunal violence and a battle in the town of Paphos, the Turkish Cypriot villagers fled Geroskipou and sought refuge mostly in Koloni and Mandria. Some of these residents fled to Northern Cyprus following the Turkish invasion of 1974 through the mountains, whilst some were escorted there by UNFICYP in 1975. These 200-220 displaced people Geroskipou were resettled in Famagusta, North Nicosia, Kyrenia, Karavas and Agios Georgios. The village was home to a camp for Turkish Cypriot prisoners of war in 1974. At least 329 people were held here; in their interviews with Turkish media the POWs claim that they were beaten and left hungry for periods of 24 hours by their captors.

Gallery

Twinnings
  Agia Paraskevi, Greece (2000)
  Fouras, France References
 Touring Guide of Pafos'' by George and Christina Karouzis

 
Municipalities in Paphos District